Ralph Joel Roberts (March 13, 1920June 18, 2015) was an American businessman who was the founder of Comcast, serving as its CEO for 46 years and as its chairman emeritus  until his death in 2015.

Early life and education
Roberts was born on March 13, 1920, in New York City. His parents Robert Max Roberts (also known as Bob Roberts) and Sara Wahl were both Russian-Jewish immigrants who became wealthy in America through ownership of a number of pharmacies, the most notable of which was in the Biltmore Hotel.

When Roberts was five the family moved to New Rochelle, New York and then after his father died of a heart-attack, to Germantown, Philadelphia when he was seventeen to live with his stepfather Harry Bobrow, of Bobrow Brothers Cigars. Roberts graduated from the Wharton School of the University of Pennsylvania and served a four-year tour on duty in the United States Navy.

Career
After leaving the Navy, Roberts held various jobs, first selling golf clubs, then working for the Muzak Company, and later the Pioneer Suspender Company, which he eventually owned. Using the proceeds from Pioneer, he started purchasing local community antenna television systems which brought TV to people in rural areas, which were then underserved by big broadcasters.

In 1963, he and his partners, Daniel Aaron and Julian A. Brodsky, paid $500,000 for a 1,200-subscriber cable TV operator in Tupelo, Mississippi, called American Cable Systems. They incorporated in 1969 as Comcast Corporation, a name Roberts invented by combining the words communications and broadcasting.

Roberts has been credited with expanding Comcast into the largest cable television company in the United States.

Accolades
Roberts served on the boards of the Philadelphia Orchestra, the Brandywine River Museum, the Greater Philadelphia Urban Affairs Coalition, and the PENN Medicine Board of Trustees. Roberts received awards from the National Cable and Telecommunications Association, the Walter Kaitz Foundation, the Anti-Defamation League of B'nai B'rith, The National Conference of Christians and Jews, the Urban League of Philadelphia, the Greater Philadelphia Chamber of Commerce, the Golden Plate Award of the American Academy of Achievement, and the National Academy of Television Arts & Sciences. He was awarded honorary degrees from both Holy Family College and the University of Pennsylvania, where he received their Joseph P. Wharton Award. In 1998, the Broadcast Pioneers of Philadelphia inducted Roberts into their Hall of Fame. The Suzanne F. and Ralph J. Roberts Foundation was one of the largest contributors to the restoration of the Alfred W. Fleisher Memorial Synagogue at Eastern State Penitentiary in Philadelphia named in the honor of his father-in-law.

Personal life
In 1942, Roberts married Suzanne Fleisher, who was also Jewish, an actress and playwright, and daughter of philanthropist Alfred W. Fleisher. Her name appears on the Suzanne Roberts Theatre in Philadelphia and she hosted a TV program aimed at seniors called "Seeking Solutions with Suzanne" on Comcast's CN8 network. They had five children: Catherine, Lisa, Ralph Jr. (Rob), Brian, and Douglas (who died in 2011); and eight grandchildren. Their son, Brian L. Roberts, is the current CEO of Comcast Corporation.

Roberts made an appearance on TLC's reality series Cake Boss, receiving a cake for his 90th birthday. He died on June 18, 2015, of natural causes.

References

External links
Biography, comcast.com
 Profile, broadcastpioneers.com

1920 births
2015 deaths
American corporate directors
American technology chief executives
American chairpersons of corporations
American cable television company founders
Jewish American philanthropists
Comcast people
University of Pennsylvania alumni
Wharton School of the University of Pennsylvania alumni
United States Navy sailors
Businesspeople from New Rochelle, New York
Businesspeople from Pennsylvania
People from Cheltenham, Pennsylvania
People from New Rochelle, New York
Ralph J.
Philanthropists from New York (state)
United States Navy personnel of World War II